Dehaj District is a district (bakhsh) in Shahr-e Babak County, Kerman Province, Iran. At the 2006 census, its population was 25,641, in 5,293 families.  The district has two cities: Dehaj and Jowzam. The district has three rural districts (dehestan): Dehaj Rural District, Jowzam Rural District, and Khabar Rural District.

References 

Shahr-e Babak County
Districts of Kerman Province